Alessandro Caprara (17 September 1626, in Bologna – 9 June 1711, in Rome) was an Italian cardinal.

Biography

Cardinal Caprara was born in Bologna on 17 September 1626. He was the eldest of the seven children of Massimo degl'Anziani and Caterina Bentivoglio.

Pope Clement XI created him a cardinal priest on 17 June 1706. He received the red hat and the title Ss. Nereo ed Achilleo.

He died on 9 June 1711 at the age of 85; at his death he was the oldest member of the College of Cardinals.

Notes

References

External links

|-

1626 births
1711 deaths
18th-century Italian cardinals
Clergy from Rome